Karl Michael Akiu (born February 12, 1962) is a former American football wide receiver who played two seasons with the Houston Oilers of the National Football League (NFL). He was drafted by the Houston Oilers in the seventh round of the 1985 NFL Draft. He first enrolled at Washington State University before transferring to the University of Hawaii at Manoa. Akiu attended Kalaheo High School in Kailua, Honolulu County, Hawaii. He was also a member of the San Francisco 49ers and Buffalo Bills.

Early years
Akiu played high school football for the Kalaheo High School Mustangs from 1976 to 1979. He played defensive back, running back, and wide
receiver for the Mustangs while earning all-state honors. He was also a centerfielder on the baseball team from 1977 to 1980 and a state champion in track and field.

College career

Washington State University
Akiu attended Washington State University on a track scholarship from 1980 to 1982.

University of Hawaii at Manoa
Akiu transferred to play college football for the Hawaii Rainbow Warriors from 1982 to 1984.

Professional career

Houston Oilers
Akiu was selected by the Houston Oilers with the 170th pick in the 1985 NFL Draft. He played in twenty games, starting one, for the Oilers from 1985 to 1986. He was released by the Oilers on September 7, 1987.

San Francisco 49ers
Akiu signed with the San Francisco 49ers on February 9, 1988. He was released by the 49ers on May 12, 1988.

Buffalo Bills
Akiu signed with the Buffalo Bills on July 1, 1988. He was released by the Bills on August 1, 1988.

Houston Oilers
Akiu was signed by the Houston Oilers on July 18, 1989. He was released by the Oilers on September 8, 1989.

Coaching career
Akiu coached the Windward Tigers Pop Warner Midgets to a 95-5 record.

Kalaheo High School
Akiu was head coach of the Kalaheo Mustangs from 2000 to 2002, accumulating an 11-14 record. He resigned in March 2003 due to time constraints in relation to his job as a stevedore.

Personal life
Akiu's son Mike Akiu, Jr. also played for the Hawaii Rainbow Warriors. On September 1, 1985, Akiu, Sr. helped apprehend a burglar who had broken into a hotel room he shared with teammate Willie Drewrey.

References

External links
Just Sports Stats
College stats

Living people
1962 births
Players of American football from Hawaii
American football wide receivers
Washington State Cougars men's track and field athletes
Hawaii Rainbow Warriors football players
Houston Oilers players
High school football coaches in Hawaii
People from Honolulu County, Hawaii